Carpenter's Mill is a ghost town in Liberty Township, Delaware County, Ohio, United States, which developed around a mill constructed ca. 1805 on the Whetstone River (now the Olentangy River).  It was designated an official Post Office in 1832, but it was discontinued in 1837.

References

Geography of Delaware County, Ohio
Ghost towns in Ohio
1805 establishments in Ohio